Cossano Belbo is a comune (municipality) in the Province of Cuneo in the Italian region Piedmont, located about  southeast of Turin and about  northeast of Cuneo.

Cossano Belbo borders the following municipalities: Camo, Cessole, Loazzolo, Mango, Rocchetta Belbo, Santo Stefano Belbo, and Vesime.

References

Cities and towns in Piedmont